Renegade Picker is the fourth album by pioneer Country rock musician Steve Young, this album moves toward the Outlaw Country sound.  The album contains his song "Lonesome, On'ry and Mean", that became a hit for fellow outlaw Waylon Jennings.

Track listing
All tracks composed by Steve Young; except where indicated
"Renegade Picker"  
"I Can't Be Myself"  (Merle Haggard)
"Old Memories"  
"It's Not Supposed to Be That Way"  (Willie Nelson)
"Tobacco Road"  (J.D. Loudermilk)
"Light of My Life"  (Weldon Allard, Johnny Hathcock)
"Lonesome, On'ry and Mean"  
"All Her Lovers Want to Be the Hero"  
"Broken Hearted People (Take Me to a Barroom)"  (Guy Clark)
"Sweet Thing" (Walter Callahan)
"Home Sweet Home (Revisited)"  (Rodney Crowell)

Personnel 
 Steve Young - guitar, vocals
 Johnny Gimble - mandolin, violin
 Buddy Emmons - steel guitar
 Jerry Shook - guitar, harmonica
 Mike Leech - bass
 Bobby Wood - keyboards
 Dale Sellars - guitar
 Terry McMillan - harmonica
 Mac Gayden - guitar
 Karl Himmel - drums
 Tracy Nelson - vocals
 Kim Young - vocals
 Kimberly Morrison-Cole - vocals
 Anita Ball - vocals

Production 
 Producer: Roy Dea
 Recording Engineer: unknown
 Art Direction: unknown
 Photography: unknown
 Liner notes: unknown

Steve Young (musician) albums
1976 albums
RCA Records albums